Chang Almas (also Romanized as Chang Almās; also known as Changamās, Changarmās, and Changmās) is a village in Dowlatabad Rural District of the Central District of Abhar County, Zanjan province, Iran. At the 2006 National Census, its population was 767 in 163 households. The following census in 2011 counted 567 people in 158 households. The latest census in 2016 showed a population of 426 people in 120 households; it was the largest village in its rural district.

References 

Abhar County

Populated places in Zanjan Province

Populated places in Abhar County